Beșiktaș Shipyard (Turkish: Beșiktaș Tersanesi) is a Turkish shipyard established in Altınova, Yalova in 2007.

See also 

 List of shipbuilders and shipyards

References

External links 
 Besiktas Shipyard

Shipyards of Turkey
Shipbuilding companies of Turkey
Turkish companies established in 2007
Altınova